Markapur revenue division (or Markapur division) is an administrative division in the Prakasam district of the Indian state of Andhra Pradesh. It is one of the 3 revenue divisions in the district which consists of 13 mandals under its administration. Markapur is the administrative headquarters of the division.

Administration 
The 13 mandals in the revenue division include:

See also 
List of revenue divisions in Andhra Pradesh
List of mandals in Andhra Pradesh

References 

Revenue divisions in Prakasam district